Andrew Gordon (born 6 July 1944) is a Scottish former footballer who played as an amateur centre forward in the Football League for Darlington, between spells in non-league football with West Auckland Town.

References

1944 births
Living people
People from Bathgate
Scottish footballers
Association football forwards
West Auckland Town F.C. players
Darlington F.C. players
English Football League players